Hulk Hogan's Celebrity Championship Wrestling was an American reality television program, which ran for eight episodes on CMT in 2008.  The first episode aired on October 18. In Australia, it premiered in July 2009 on the FOX8 channel. It was also shown in the UK on Bravo and Viva. It was co-produced by Hulk Hogan and Bischoff-Hervey Entertainment. It featured celebrities being trained to become professional wrestlers. The finale aired on December 6, when Dennis Rodman was declared the winner.

Cast

Judges
Hulk Hogan – Hogan held multiple championships in his career during his tenures in the WWF/WWE and WCW, and was inducted into the WWE Hall of Fame in 2005.  Additionally is known for his acting outside of the wrestling area and serves as the host, creator and executive producer (the latter two duties credit him as "Terry Bollea") of the series.  He is the main judge and dismisses the eliminated contenders in the competition by declaring "You're a jabroni, get out of my damn ring!".
Eric Bischoff – Known for being the Executive Producer and later President of WCW and an occasional on-air personality during his tenures with both the original WCW and WWF/E. He appeared as an announcer, a member of Hogan's nWo faction in WCW and as the general manager of the WWE Raw brand. Bischoff is also credited as creator and executive producer of the series alongside business partner Jason Hervey and Hogan.
Jimmy Hart – In-ring manager who worked for several different promotions including WWF/E, WCW, TNA, and others. Best known to fans as the "Mouth of the South" with his signature megaphone, he accompanied several wrestling stars like Hulk Hogan to the ring as manager.

Other
The trainers included Brutus "The Barber" Beefcake, Brian Knobs (who are best friends of Hogan), and Tom Howard. Bubba the Love Sponge was the special commentator.

Former professional wrestlers also made special appearances in the series. Bill Goldberg, a film actor and former WCW World Heavyweight Champion and WWE World Heavyweight Champion, guest starred in the sixth episode. Rob Van Dam, a former ECW World Heavyweight Champion and WWE Champion, guest starred in the fifth episode.

Contestants

 Bonaduce was originally eliminated in week 5 because of an injury, but he was brought back in week 6. He was later eliminated in week 7.

Episode recaps

Week 1

The moves learned were the forearm smash, clothesline, and a kick to the midsection. Team Nasty won the match.

Week 2

In week two, the moves learned by the celebrities included the headlock take down, schoolboy pin, and shoulder tackle. Originally, Dennis Rodman was going to wrestle for Team Nasty, with Stallone managing. During practice, however, Rodman injured his arm attempting a flying clothesline on Coach Nasty. Team Beefcake won the match.

Week 3

The basic tie up, as well as the techniques for working the arm and working the ropes, were the moves of the week. The challenge in week three was for the individual celebrities to create for themselves a gimmick, which is a character or persona. Team Beefcake won the match.

Week 4

The moves learned included the hip toss, taking the turnbuckle, and the elbow smash. The two teams tied for best match.

Week 5

In week five, the celebrities learned the "Over the Top" and "Duck and Boost" techniques. They also created their own finishing moves. "Dangerous" Danny Bonaduce was going to be in the match, but he had to withdraw due to an injury he sustained during practice. The two teams merged into one team, Team Hogan.

Week 6

The celebrities learned how to hit the head, back, and gut of their opponents with weapons (Trash cans, chairs, etc.) in week six. Danny Bonaduce returned because his injury was not as bad as originally thought. Because he was not eliminated face-to-face, Hogan allowed him to return.

Week 7

The last three professional wrestling moves were taught to the celebrities in week seven. The three moves of the week were the arm drag, basic chop, and body slam.

Week 8
In week eight, there were four remaining contestants. Diamond and Butterbean were eliminated after the tag team event. Bridges was eliminated in the final episode after the final main event. Dennis Rodman was declared the winner and the first CCW Champion.

References

External links
Official Site

2000s American reality television series
2008 American television series debuts
2008 American television series endings
CMT (American TV channel) original programming
American professional wrestling television series
English-language television shows
Hulk Hogan